Ferdinand Jacobus van Ingen (8 December 1933 – 27 February 2021) was a Dutch scholar of Germanistics. He was a professor of German literature at the Vrije Universiteit Amsterdam between 1972 and 1998.

Life
Van Ingen was born on 8 December 1933 in Maartensdijk. He studied German studies, literary science, art history and musicology at Utrecht University, the Free University of Berlin and the Ludwig Maximilian University of Munich. He obtained his PhD in 1962 from Utrecht University.

From 1957 to 1962 he was a scientific assistant at the Institute for German Language and Literature in Utrecht. In 1964 van Ingen became a lecturer at the Vrije Universiteit Amsterdam. In 1970 he became associate professor and in 1972 full professor for new German literature. He retired in 1998.

Van Ingen published on German and Dutch literature of the 17th century. He was known for his work on the Baroque time and contributed to expanding the Herzog August Library in Wolfenbüttel. Van Ingen was elected a member of the Royal Netherlands Academy of Arts and Sciences in 1978.

He died in Zeist on 27 February 2021.

References

1933 births
2021 deaths
Germanists
Members of the Royal Netherlands Academy of Arts and Sciences
People from De Bilt
Utrecht University alumni
Academic staff of Vrije Universiteit Amsterdam